William “Bill” Levins (1922 – August 26, 1991) was an American ice hockey executive and sports entrepreneur. Levins was the first general manager of the Oklahoma City Blazers of the old Central Hockey League. He is also recognized as the co-founder, along with Ray Miron, of the current Central Hockey League which began play with the 1992–93 season.

Levins lived in Minnesota until 1965 when he moved to Oklahoma City to become the general manager of the Oklahoma City Blazers. The William “Bill” Levins Memorial Cup was the name of the trophy awarded to the champion of the Central Hockey League from 1992 until 2000 when the honour was renamed the "Ray Miron Cup". Levins died at the age of 69 in Oklahoma City, Oklahoma.

Awards and honours

References

American sports businesspeople
1922 births
1991 deaths
20th-century American businesspeople